"DNA" (stylized as "DNA.") is a song by American rapper Kendrick Lamar from his fourth studio album Damn. Despite not being released as a single, the song received support at rhythmic radio after its official music video was released. The second track on the album (thirteenth on the Collector's Edition of Damn), it was written by Lamar, while the production was handled by Mike Will Made It.

The song's music video was released on April 18, 2017, and features American actor Don Cheadle.

Recording and production 
"DNA" was the second song from Damn to be recorded by Lamar and Mike Will, after "Humble". After the first verse was recorded with the beat that Mike Will had already prepared, Lamar started rapping the second verse a capella, requesting that Mike Will build the beat around the rap.  Lamar proposed that it sound like "chaos", and Mike Will put together the second half of the song with the intention to make it "sound like he's battling the beat". The song samples "Mary Jane" by Rick James.

Critical reception 
The song has been described as "the most virtuosic display" on Damn by Vice. Entertainment Weekly praised the song as "technically peerless" and Lamar's "astonishing flow". Music critic Neil McCormick, for The Telegraph, called "DNA" a "punchy electro mantra about identity".

Billboard named "DNA" as the thirty-first best song of the year in their list of the 100 best songs of the year.

Music video 
The song's music video, directed by Nabil Elderkin and released on April 18, 2017, features American actor Don Cheadle. The video, directed by Nabil and The Little Homies, begins with Cheadle entering an interrogation room, where Lamar is being held captive and attached to a lie detector machine. After Cheadle mocks Lamar, he turns the machine on where he's shocked with Lamar's life force and begins rapping the track. From here, Cheadle and Lamar switch back and forth from rapping the song, mirroring each other's movements along the way until Cheadle finally succumbs to Lamar and lets him go. Afterwards, scenes of Lamar rapping alone along with some of his friends, including American rapper Schoolboy Q, follow. The video ends with an extended outro for the song, as Schoolboy Q approaches and punches the camera in slow motion. The video features the use of Chinese in the second half, with Kendrick subtitled "功夫肯尼" ("Kung Fu Kenny", an alternate name used throughout the Damn album) and Kendrick's crew being given "的家庭" (De jiātíng; "the family"). The Top Dawg Entertainment logo is presented alongside "顶级狗娱乐" (Dǐngjí gǒu yúlè, literally "top level dog entertainment").

Upon release, the music video received positive reviews from critics.

Live performances 
Lamar performed "DNA" at the Coachella Valley Music and Arts Festival on April 23, 2017. Lamar also performed "DNA" on The Damn Tour. He also performed the song at the 60th Annual Grammy Awards.

Usage in media
An unreleased version of the song, with a new verse, was used during ESPN's coverage of the 2017 NBA Finals, and Lamar also appeared in accompanying promos. It was also used to introduce NBA Live 18 in promotional material. The song was also used as a part of Madden NFL 18’s soundtrack, along with NBA Live 18.

The song was featured in a Beats headphones commercial starring New England Patriots quarterback Tom Brady. The song was also featured in a Beats X commercial featuring DJ Khaled.

The song was also featured on Apple’s HomePod smart speaker advertisement named "Beat".

The song is featured in the first trailer for Creed II.

On October 12, 2018, the soundtrack for the film The Hate U Give featured the song.

The song was played to close Dave Chappelle's 2019 stand-up special Sticks & Stones.

The song was also featured in the launch trailer of Mortal Kombat 11: Aftermath expansion.

Credits and personnel 
Credits adapted from the official Damn digital booklet.
Kendrick Lamar – vocals, songwriter
Mike Will Made It – songwriter, producer
Matt Schaeffer – additional guitar
Derek Ali – mixing
Tyler Page – mix assistant
Cyrus Taghipour – mix assistant

Charts

Weekly charts

Year-end charts

Certifications

References 

2017 songs
Kendrick Lamar songs
Songs written by Kendrick Lamar
Songs written by Mike Will Made It
Song recordings produced by Mike Will Made It
Music videos directed by Nabil Elderkin
2017 singles
Interscope Records singles
Aftermath Entertainment singles
Top Dawg Entertainment singles
Trap music songs
Hardcore hip hop songs